{{Infobox Cultivar 
| name = Ulmus 'Recerta'
| hybrid = U. pumila × U. minor
| genus = Ulmus| cultivar = 'Recerta'
| image = Recerta, Amsterdam, Amerbos.jpg
| image_caption = 'Recerta' at Amerbos, Amsterdam.
| origin = US 
}}Ulmus 'Recerta'''' is an American hybrid cultivar raised by the Wisconsin Alumni Research Foundation (WARF) as selection '196-5' from seed obtained from a Siberian Elm Ulmus pumila in Volgagrad, Russia; the male parent deduced as the Field Elm Ulmus minor''.

Description
'Recerta' produces a straight, clean stem, supporting a rounded crown.  The leaves are elliptic, with typically acuminate tip, the blade 6–12 cm long by 3–6.5 cm broad; the margins are doubly, if bluntly, serrate.

Pests and diseases
Tests in the USA found the cultivar to be only 'somewhat resistant to Dutch elm disease', meanwhile evaluation in France by the Institut National de la Recherche Agronomique (INRA) confirmed the tree as only 'moderately resistant'.

Cultivation
Serious doubts as to the tree's long term culture in Europe have been expressed.  Although registered in 1993 as 'Recerta' by Conrad Appel KG (ceased trading 2006), of Darmstadt, Germany, the tree is not known to have ever been in commerce.

Notable trees
A mature specimen grows in a park in the Amerbos district of north Amsterdam, planted in the early 1990s along with other elm cultivars.

Accessions
Not known.

References

Hybrid elm cultivar
Ulmus articles with images
Ulmus